Sung Kyung-Mo (born 26 June 1980) is a South Korean football player who played for Jeonbuk Hyundai Motors, Incheon United and Gwangju FC.

He was released for accepting bribes as part of a probe into match-fixing in the league on 19 May 2011. On 17 June 2011, his football career was rescinded by the Korea Professional Football League with other accomplices.

References

External links 

1980 births
Living people
South Korean footballers
Incheon United FC players
Gwangju FC players
K League 1 players
Association football goalkeepers
Sportspeople banned for life